Caroline McAllister is a Scottish international indoor and lawn bowler.

McAllister won the Women's singles at the 1998 World Indoor Bowls Championship defeating Carol Ashby in the final. One year later she became the first player to retain the title by beating Kate Adams in the final at the 1999 World Indoor Bowls Championship.

References

Living people
Scottish female bowls players
Year of birth missing (living people)
Indoor Bowls World Champions